Jumpstart 4th Grade refers to two very different educational products created by Knowledge Adventure:

JumpStart Adventures 4th Grade: Haunted Island
JumpStart Adventures 4th Grade: Sapphire Falls